Hans Ernst August Buchner (16 December 1850 – 5 April 1902) was a German bacteriologist who was born and raised in Munich. He was the older brother of Eduard Buchner (1860–1917), winner of the 1907 Nobel Prize in Chemistry.

Biography 
He studied medicine in Munich and Leipzig, earning his MD from the University of Leipzig in 1874. Afterwards he served as a physician in the Bavarian Army. In 1880 he became a lecturer at the University of Munich, where in 1894 he succeeded Max von Pettenkofer (1818–1901) as professor and director of the institute of hygiene. At Munich, he was an associate of Max von Gruber (1853–1927).

Hans Buchner was a pioneer in the field of immunology. He was the first to discover a substance in blood serum that was capable of destroying bacteria. He called the substance "alexin", which was later named "complement" by Paul Ehrlich (1854–1915).

In 1888 he introduced the pyrogallic method for cultivation of anaerobic bacteria. Along with Martin Hahn, he assisted his brother, Eduard Buchner, with the isolation of zymase. Their findings were published in a 1903 treatise titled "Die Zymasegärung" (Zymase fermentation).

Selected writings
 Die ätiologische Therapie und Prophylaxe der Lungentuberculose. (Aetiological therapy and prophylaxis involving lung tuberculosis); (1883)
 Über die bakterientödtende Wirkung des zellenfreien Blutserums (On the bacteriological effects of cell-free blood serum); (1889)
 Die Zymasegärung : Untersuchungen über den Inhalt der Hefezellen und die biologische Seite des Gärungsproblems (with Eduard Buchner and Martin Hahn, 1903) - Zymase fermentation : Studies on the content of yeast cells and the biological side of the fermentation problem.

References 

 "Parts of this article are based on a translation of an equivalent article at the German Wikipedia".
 The Free Dictionary, Eduard Buchner

External links 
 A Simple Way of using Buchner's Method for the Cultivation of Anaërobic Bacteria  NCBI J Med Res. 1906 July; 15(1): 113–116.1
Scientific American, "Experimental Transformation of a Living Organism", 06 November 1880, p. 296

1850 births
1902 deaths
German microbiologists
German immunologists